Bricket Wood is a village in the county of Hertfordshire, England,  south of St Albans and  north-northeast of Watford.

History
The area of Bricket Wood was mostly occupied by farmers until Bricket Wood railway station was built in 1861. In 1889 brothers Henry Gray and William Gray bought up land in the area and built Woodside Retreat Fairground. The fairground attracted hordes of visitors to the area from London and nearby towns and a small village developed around the station. In 1923, a rival fairground named Joyland was built nearby by R.B Christmas. Both resorts were closed in 1929, Christmas used his leftover land for building bungalows.

During the 1930s the area became popular with naturists after Charles Macaskie set up the naturist camp Spielplatz on the outskirts of the village. Naturists bought up plots of land on the edge of the village and built their own communities, which at first didn't have electricity or running water. The village also began to attract Wiccans after Gerald Gardner set up the Bricket Wood coven.

During the 1950s housing estates were built for employees of aviation company Handley Page, who had a plant at nearby Radlett. More estates then followed, aimed at commuters desiring housing near the Green Belt with convenient access to London.

Civil organisation and notable buildings
Bricket Wood is in the civil parish of St. Stephen, part of the St Albans district which shares provision of local government services with Hertfordshire County Council.

St Luke's Church is the Anglican place of worship. The local primary school is Mount Pleasant Lane, situated in grounds that include a small pond.

Close to the village stands Hanstead House, built by Sir David Yule in 1925, who is buried in the grounds. It formerly operated as the Hanstead Stud, breeding Arab horses, as the UK campus of the Worldwide Church of God's Ambassador College, and as a corporate training centre. In 2022 it was converted into luxury apartments.

Transport
The station building was taken into private ownership in 2018, and is being developed into a sympathetic recreation of its original appearance. It will be a village hub and meeting room, as well as a station.

Morris Dancing 
The village is home to the Morris Dancing team, Wicket Brood Border Morris.

Common
Bricket Wood Common is a  Site of Special Scientific Interest.

Notable residents
Frank Turner (1922-2010), three-time Olympic gymnast, died at his home in the village.
Ralph Coates, footballer who played for England and Tottenham Hotspur, lived in the village until his death in December 2010.

References

External links

 Bricket Wood Residents' Association
 Bricket Wood Facebook Group.

Villages in Hertfordshire